Phagnalon is a genus of flowering plants in the family Asteraceae native to Europe, Asia, and North Africa.

 Species

References

Gnaphalieae
Asteraceae genera